Ghatak: Lethal is an Indian 1996 Hindi-language action thriller film directed by Rajkumar Santoshi, starring Sunny Deol, Meenakshi Seshadri, and Amrish Puri, while Danny Denzongpa plays the antagonist. Marking Santoshi's third collaboration with Deol, Seshadri, and Puri after Ghayal (1990) and Damini (1993), it earned  worldwide to become the fourth highest-grossing Bollywood film of the year, and won three awards including Best Supporting Actor for Puri at the 42nd Filmfare Awards, where it was also nominated for three other awards: Best Director for Santoshi, Best Actor for Deol, and Best Villain for Denzongpa. Ghatak is Seshadri's last film to date. The film was later remade in Telugu as Aapthudu (2004) starring Rajasekhar and Anjala Zaveri.

Plot
Kashi (Sunny Deol) is a kind-hearted wrestler and the dutiful adopted son of Shambhu Nath (Amrish Puri) living in Banaras. Shambhu Nath, who was a freedom fighter awarded with Tambra Patra, is an honourable and respectable man in town. Kashi comes to Mumbai with his father for his medical treatment for his throat and stays with his brother Shiv Nath (K. K. Raina). Kashi meets Gauri (Meenakshi Seshadri) and starts liking her. He learns that the colony is being terrorized by a tyrannical gangster named Katya (Danny Denzongpa) along with his other six brothers. Before Kashi's arrival, a resident named Sachdev (Om Puri) tries to initiate revolt against Katya, but gets ruthlessly killed by him, thereby making Malti (Ila Arun), wife of Sachdev, go mad. Katya and his brothers become enemies with Kashi when he beats up their goons when they were beating up Malti. Shambhu Nath is later diagnosed with throat cancer and has only a few days to live.

When Kashi refuses to join Katya's gang, Katya becomes furious and humiliates Shambhu Nath before the entire colony. After a series of dramatic events, Shiv Nath is ran over to death by Jeena (Mukesh Rishi), one of Katya's brothers. Kashi then kills Antya (Deep Dhillon) and gets arrested. Meanwhile, Shambhu Nath dies of cancer. When Kashi was going to disperse his father's ashes at the Ghat with the police, the police van gets attacked by Katya's brothers and goons. Kashi kills all of them, including Katya's three brothers, and reaches Katya's home. There he kills Jeena, thereby causing only two brothers to survive, including Katya. As Katya made Kashi's father dog, he made Kashi as an ox and takes him to the colony to re-establish his supremacy. But Kashi stands up, and Katya's entire gang is then attacked by the residents. The sixth brother Bhiku (Tinu Verma), is then killed by the mob. Kashi makes Katya a dog and asks him to bark. Katya, having no choice, barks on Kashi's instructions. Kashi then kills Katya, and the colony gets freedom from his tyranny.

Cast

Production
Originally, Kamal Haasan was signed to play the lead role and the advertisement appearing in Screen  read as  Welcome back to Hindi Screen, but Kamal withdrew from the film for unknown reasons.

Soundtrack
The music for the movie was mainly composed by R. D. Burman. The song "Koi Jaye To Le Aaye" was the only song composed by Anu Malik, and it became popular.

Box office
The film was made at a budget of Rs. 62.5 million, did collections of Rs. 265 million and was declared a Blockbuster.

Awards
42nd Filmfare Awards:
Won
 Best Supporting Actor – Amrish Puri
 Best Screenplay – Rajkumar Santoshi
 Best Editing – V. N. Mayekar
Nominated
 Best Director – Rajkumar Santoshi
Best Actor – Sunny Deol
 Best Villain – Danny Denzongpa

References

External links
 

1996 films
Films scored by R. D. Burman
Films directed by Rajkumar Santoshi
1990s Hindi-language films
1990s action drama films
1996 action thriller films
Hindi films remade in other languages
Films scored by Anu Malik
Indian action drama films
Indian action thriller films
Films about social issues in India
Indian films about cancer
Fictional portrayals of the Maharashtra Police
1996 drama films